Turlu is a village in the Nizip District, Gaziantep Province, Turkey.

References

Villages in Nizip District